The Rupnarayan River is a river in India.  It begins as the Dhaleswari (Dhalkisor) in the Chhota Nagpur plateau foothills northeast of the town of Purulia.  It then follows a tortuous southeasterly course past the town of Bankura, where it is known as the Dwarakeswar river.  Near the town of Ghatal it is joined by the Shilabati river, where it takes the name Rupnarayan.  Finally, it joins the Hoogli River.  It is famous for the Hilsa fish that live in it and are used in Bengali cuisine.  It is also notable for the West Bengal Power Development Corporation Limited (WBPDCL) thermal power plant built along its bank at Kolaghat in West Bengal. The river also passes through Bagnan in Howrah district.

Rupnarayan River forms the eastern boundary of district Purba Medinipur with district Howrah.

See also

 List of rivers of India

References

Rivers of West Bengal
Rivers of India